The 1980 Campeonato Ecuatoriano de Fútbol de la Serie A was the 22nd national championship for football teams in Ecuador.

Teams
The number of teams for this season was played by 12 teams. Deportivo Quito and LDU Cuenca promoted as winners of First Stage of Serie B.

First stage

Second stage

Liguilla Final

References

External links
 RSSSF - Ecuador 1980
 Artículo Oficial de Barcelona Campeón Nacional 1980 en la página web del Diario El Universo
 archivo futbol ecuatoriano - NOTA 1980
 archivo futbol ecuatoriano - AÑO 1980
 Línea de Tiempo de eventos y partidos de Liga Deportiva Universitaria
 Calendario de partidos históricos de Liga Deportiva Universitaria
 Sistema de Consulta Interactiva y Herramienta de consulta interactiva de partidos de Liga Deportiva Universitaria

1980
Ecu